Dikmen is a town and district of Sinop Province in the Black Sea region of Turkey.

Localities
Locations in the district include:
 Usta Köy

References

External links
 District governor's official website 

Populated places in Sinop Province
Districts of Sinop Province